The Rural Municipality of Siglunes is a former rural municipality (RM) in the Canadian province of Manitoba. It was originally incorporated as a rural municipality on April 1, 1919. It ceased on January 1, 2015, as a result of its provincially mandated amalgamation with the RM of Eriksdale to form the Municipality of West Interlake.

The former RM is located on the east shore of Lake Manitoba at the narrowest part of the lake, across from the Rural Municipality of Alonsa to the west.

Communities 
 Ashern
 Oakview
 The Narrows
 Vogar

References

External links 
 
 Map of Siglunes R.M. at Statcan

Siglunes
Populated places disestablished in 2015
2015 disestablishments in Manitoba